Commissioner of Education is a title used in a number of different governmental education departments or ministries. It may refer to:

The head of the Rivers State Ministry of Education in Nigeria
The head of Tanzania's Ministry of Education and Vocational Training
United States Commissioner of Education, a position that existed historically in the U.S. federal government
Educational leadership positions in several individual U.S. states, including:
 The head of the Florida Department of Education
 The head of the Kentucky Board of Elementary and Secondary Education, a leader of Kentucky Education
 The chief officer of the Massachusetts Board of Education
 Commissioner of Education of the State of New York
 The head of the Texas Education Agency
 Vermont State Commissioner of Education, leader of the Vermont Department of Education